A kneecap is a leg bone. 

Kneecap may also refer to:

 Kneecap (band), Irish band
 NECAP, or the New England Common Assessment Program, pronounced "knee cap"
Kneecapping, a form of malicious wounding in which the victim is injured in the knee (but rarely injuring the kneecap)